Blommenslyst is a village, situated west of Odense, in Funen, Denmark. As of 1. January 2022, it had a population of 538. It contains the Blommenslyst Golf Club.

References

Suburbs of Odense
Populated places in Funen
Odense Municipality